Ramanos is a poorly attested extinct language of what is now Bolivia. Glottolog concludes that "the minuscule wordlist ... shows no convincing resemblances to surrounding languages".

Vocabulary
Ramanos word list from the late 1700s published in Palau and Saiz (1989):

{| class="wikitable"
! Spanish gloss !! English gloss !! Ramanos
|-
| bueno || good || esumatá
|-
| malo || bad || emayio
|-
| el padre || father || tatá
|-
| la madre || mother || naná
|-
| el hermano || brother || nochoine
|-
| uno || one || eapurava
|-
| dos || two || casevava
|-
| tres || three || quimisa
|}

References

Unclassified languages of South America